Henry Johnson (18 May 1819 –  November 1891), better known by his alias Harry Power, was an Irish-born convict who became a bushranger in Australia. From 1869 to 1870, he was accompanied by a young Ned Kelly, who went on to become Australia's best known bushranger.

Early life
Henry Johnson, also known as Harry Power, was born in Waterford, Ireland, on 18 May 1819 and grew up in Ashton-under-Lyne, Lancashire, England. When he was sixteen years of age his father had him apprenticed to the saddler trade. Later on he joined the peasants in their conflicts with the British troops. It was during this time that he received the sabre wounds on his face, which are described in the Victorian police records as, "Scar over right eyebrow, scars on right cheek."

Bushranging

He was convicted at Salford, Lancashire, on 31 August 1840, and was sentenced to transportation for seven years to Australia for stealing a bridle and saddle, under the name of Henry Johnson, and adhered to that name until he became a ticket-of-leave man.

He was freed in 1848 and moved to Sydney. By now he was calling himself Harry Power. 

Power was engaged driving cattle all over Victoria and New South Wales, and later joined Captain Denman's party in exploring and cutting a track across the ranges. In a few years he became a splendid bushman, knowing almost every mile of the country. During all this time he appears to have been getting an honest living, even keeping a horse yard at Geelong, which is ostensibly a respectable calling. One incident changed his whole career. He was riding one of his own horses near Sandhurst when he was bailed up by two drunken German troopers. "I was going along quietly", says Power, "when down came the two troopers, hooting and shouting. I saw they were drunk, and pulled on one side, but they stopped me. 'Whose horse is that?' says one. 'It's mine,' says I. 'Are you going to shout?' says the other. 'No,' says I, for I didn't like the Germans. 'I believe you stole that horse,' says the first.' 'You're a liar,' says I. ' You'll have to come along with us,' says the other. 'I won't do it,' says I, getting riled. On that one of them drew his hanger, and said he'd make me. 'You can't,' says I. He charged at me, and I'd only just time to draw my revolver, or he'd have cut me down. I shot him, and then the other fellow rode up and fired at me, and the powder singed my coat. I shot him, and then rode off. Now, if I had been sensible, I'd have ridden off to the nearest police station and given myself up. But I was frightened, and rode across the colony, thinking to go and stay in New South Wales till the row was over. At the Murray I was stopped. I did not deny my name or resist. They arrested and brought me down to Melbourne, and I got 10 years. The men were not hurt much, and it was proved they stopped me without cause, or I'd have got more."

After serving six years, he was either released or escaped.  He was jailed again in 1864 for horse stealing. 

Escaping from Pentridge Prison in 1869, the 50-year-old Power turned to highway robbery and became known as a bushranger. A reward of £500 was offered for his capture (a large sum of money at that time). There were claims that during these robberies Power had a young assistant who took care of the horses. Suspicion fell on the then 16-year-old Ned Kelly. Power himself was captured on 5 June 1870. Power believed Ned Kelly had betrayed him, he was arrested while sleeping in a hut on the Glenmore Run which was squatted by the Quinn family, Ned Kelly's grandparents and uncles.

Later life
Power was not released from prison until 9 February 1885, aged 66. For a while he worked on the old Prison Hulk Success, on which he had once served a sentence, and was by then a museum. In November 1891 Harry Power fell into the Murray River and drowned while fishing at Swan Hill, Victoria.

Legacy 

Power's Lookout Reserve near Whitfield, Victoria is named after Harry Power.

Power's relationship with Kelly is depicted in the 1980 miniseries The Last Outlaw, where he was played by Gerard Kennedy. The relationship is also depicted in Peter Carey's Booker Prize winning novel True History of the Kelly Gang. In the film adaptation of the novel, Power is portrayed by Russell Crowe, opposite Orlando Schwerdt as a young Ned Kelly.

References

Convict records: http://www.convictrecords.com.au/convicts/johnson/henry/59304

External links

 Photos of Harry Power from the State Library of Victoria

1819 births
1891 deaths
Bushrangers
Australian outlaws
Irish emigrants to Australia
Deaths by drowning in Australia
Accidental deaths in Victoria (Australia)
English emigrants to Australia
People from Waterford (city)
People from Ashton-under-Lyne